The 4th Parliament of Ontario was in session from June 5, 1879, until February 1, 1883, just prior to the 1883 general election. The majority party was the Liberal Party  led by Oliver Mowat.

Charles Clarke served as speaker for the assembly.

Notes

References

A History of Ontario : its resources and development., Alexander Fraser
 Members in Parliament 4

04
1879 establishments in Ontario
1883 disestablishments in Ontario